The ExxonMobil Building (formerly the Humble Building) was built in 1963 in Houston. It remained the tallest building west of the Mississippi only until 1965, when Elm Place was built in Dallas.

As of 2011, ExxonMobil is the owner of the building. One of the most distinctive features of the building is the cantilevered seven-foot-wide shades on each floor that protrude from the side of the building to provide shade from the daytime sun.

The building is two blocks east of 1500 Louisiana Street; a parking lot is between the two buildings.

The architect of the International style structure was Welton Becket and Associates.

During the Houston Astros' 2004 NLCS run (playoffs), the top of the building was crowned by hundreds of tiny blue lights while an enormous Astros star (logo) made of white lights was hung on the south side of the building.

In 2011 the company announced that all employees in the ExxonMobil building are moving to the new ExxonMobil office in Spring. ExxonMobil did not state what it plans to do with the building after the employees leave.

In January 2013, Shorenstein Properties announced it had acquired the property for an undisclosed amount. ExxonMobil immediately leased back the entire building into 2015. Shorenstein Properties announced plans to undertake significant improvements following ExxonMobil's departure.

In 2015 Mayor of Houston Annise Parker proposed moving municipal court and Houston Police Department operations into the ExxonMobil building. Charles McClelland, the head of HPD, stated that having so many law enforcement and public safety agencies concentrated in a single building may be a safety risk, citing the 1995 Oklahoma City bombing. In September 2015 Parker's administration announced that the plan would not move forward due to concerns over costs.

Tenants
The top two floors were formerly dining space for the Petroleum Club of Houston, which had moved to the ExxonMobil Building in 1963. The club was accessible through elevators on Bell Street. Because of the sale and scheduled renovation of the ExxonMobil Building, the club was forced to find a new location. In late January 2015 it was scheduled to move to Total Plaza.

References

External links

ThePetroleum Club of Houston official website

 

ExxonMobil buildings and structures
Skyscraper office buildings in Houston
International style architecture in Texas
Buildings and structures in Houston
Welton Becket buildings
Office buildings completed in 1963
Downtown Houston